Tuxen is a Danish surname. Notable people with the surname include: 

 Erik Tuxen (1902–1957), conductor
 Fanny Tuxen (1832–1906), writer
 Helle Tuxen (born 2001), Norwegian diver
 Laurits Tuxen (1853–1927), painter
 Nicoline Tuxen (1847–1931), painter
 Saxil Tuxen (1885–1975), Australian town planner

See also
 Cape Tuxen